United Nations Security Council Resolution 2701 is a United Nations Security Council resolution adopted unanimously on 27 June 2013. It removes Iraq from its obligations concerning the return of Kuwaiti and third-state nationals or their remains to their proper state that were seized under the former Saddam regime. Following the passage of the resolution, Hoshyar Zebari, Iraq's foreign minister, said that it marked a turning point in Iraq's relationship with the international community, and a significant step in the process of mending bilateral ties. 
  All the negative aspects of the relationship between the countries have become part of the past.  We will focus on the present and the future, and what the brotherly relations can achieve to consolidate peace, security and stability in the region.

References

External links
Text of the Resolution at undocs.org

 2107
2013 in Iraq
2013 in Kuwait
 2107
 2107
June 2013 events